The Telangana Pollution Control Board is an ministry of Government of Telangana. It is body of the Department of Health and Family Welfare, Government of the State of Telangana, India. The board is charged with enforcing laws related to environmental protection.

History
TSPCB was constituted under Sec.4 of Water (Prevention & Control of Pollution) Act, 1974 and Section 5 of Air (Prevention & Control of Pollution) Act, 1981, on 07-07-2014.

Responsibilities
The Board has the responsibility of implementing a series of Environmental Acts and Rules:
 Water Act
 Air Act
 Environment Protection Act
 Hazardous Waste Rules
 Bio Medical Waste Rules
 Municipal Solid Waste Rules
 Plastic Manufacture, Sale and Usage Rules
 E-Waste (Management and Handling) Rules, 2011.

Functions
Some of the functions of Telangana Pollution Board are :
 To encourage, conduct and participate in investigations and research relating to problems of water pollution and prevention, control or abatement of water pollution
 Lay down, modify or annul effluent standards for the sewage and trade effluents and for the quality of receiving waters resulting from the discharge of effluents and to classify waters of the State
To advise the State Government with respect to the location of any industry the carrying on of which is likely to pollute a stream
To evolve methods of utilisation of sewage and suitable trade effluents in agriculture

See also
Awaaz Foundation Non-governmental organisation in India, works towards preserving and enhancing environment and for other socially oriented causes.

References

2014 establishments in Telangana
Government agencies established in 2014
State agencies of Telangana
State pollution control boards of India